Anne Grey was a British actress.

Anne Grey may refer to:

Anne Brandon, Baroness Grey of Powys, married name Anne Grey
Ann Grey, wife of Lord Charles Cavendish
Lady Anne Grey (1490–1545), a daughter of George Grey, 2nd Earl of Kent

See also
Anne Gray McCready